The scapholunate ligament is a ligament of the wrist.

Rupture of the scapholunate ligament causes scapholunate instability, which, if untreated, will eventually cause a predictable pattern of wrist osteoarthritis called scapholunate advanced collapse (SLAC).

Anatomy
The scapholunate ligament is an intraarticular ligament binding the scaphoid and lunate bones of the wrist together. It is divided into three areas, dorsal, proximal and palmar, with the dorsal segment being the strongest part. It is the main stabilizer of the scaphoid. In contrast to the scapholunate ligament, the lunotriquetral ligament is more prominent on the palmar side.

Instability
Complete rupture of this ligament leads to wrist instability. The main type of such instability is dorsal intercalated segment instability (DISI) deformity, where the lunate angulates to the posterior side of the hand.

A dynamic scapholunate instability is where the scapholunate ligament is completely ruptured, but secondary scaphoid stabilizers are still preserved; these are the scaphotrapezial (ST), scaphocapitate (SC) and radioscaphocapitate (RSC) ligaments. In a static scapholunate instability, these other ligaments are ruptured as well.

Diagnosis
X-ray images indicate scapholunate ligament instability when the scapholunate distance is more than 3 mm, which is called scapholunate dissociation. A static scapholunate instability is generally readily visible, but a dynamic scapholunate instability can only be seen radiographically in certain wrist positions or under certain loading conditions, such as when clenching the wrist, or loading the wrist in ulnar deviation.

In order to diagnose a SLAC wrist you need a posterior anterior (PA) view X-ray, a lateral view X-ray and a fist view X-ray. The fist X-ray is often made if there is no convincing Terry Thomas sign. A fist X-ray of a scapholunate ligament rupture will show a descending capitate bone. Making a fist will give pressure at the capitate, which will descend if there is a rupture in the scapholunate ligament.

The Watson's test may be used in diagnosis.

Treatment
Treatment will vary depending upon the degree of injury and can range from observation and direct ligament repair through to reconstruction.

Complications

Eventually, untreated scapholunate instability generally causes a predictable pattern of wrist osteoarthritis called scapholunate advanced collapse (SLAC).

References

Ligaments of the upper limb